The Bob Kerr Irish Senior Cup, known for sponsorship reasons as the RSA Bob Kerr Irish Senior Cup is a 50-over cricket competition for Irish amateur clubs. It is the most important knock-out cricket club competition in Ireland, is organised by Cricket Ireland and comprises the top teams from each of Ireland's four active provincial unions (Leinster, Munster, NCU and North West). Connacht Cricket Union, the youngest, smallest and weakest provincial union, do not enter teams in their own right, but County Galway CC enters as a member club in Munster.

Sponsorship
It was sponsored initially by Schweppes and then Royal Liver, and the current sponsor is RSA. It was renamed in honour of Bob Kerr, who died at the 2007 Cricket World Cup.

Matches are of 50-overs duration, though this may be reduced to as few as ten overs per side where delays or interruptions necessitate.

Each team must contain not less than nine players fully eligible to play for Ireland in all competitions.

Waringstown are the most successful club in the competition with 6 wins, and as of 2019, Pembroke are the current holders after beating Waringstown in the 2019 final.

Summary of finalists

List of finals

1980s

1990s

2000s

2010s

2020s

Summary of winners by province

By country

See also
Leinster Senior League
NCU Senior League
North West Senior League
Ulster Cup

References
Cricket Ireland Archives

Irish domestic cricket competitions